The Chief Master Sergeant of the Air Force (acronym: CMSAF) is a unique non-commissioned rank in the United States Air Force. The holder of this rank and position of office represents the highest enlisted level of leadership in the Air Force, unless an enlisted airman is serving as the Senior Enlisted Advisor to the Chairman. The CMSAF provides direction for the enlisted corps and represents their interests, as appropriate, to the American public, and to those in all levels of government. The CMSAF is appointed by the Air Force Chief of Staff (AF/CC) and serves as the senior enlisted advisor to the Air Force Chief of Staff and the Secretary of the Air Force on all issues regarding the welfare, readiness, morale, and proper utilization and progress of the enlisted force.

The current Chief Master Sergeant of the Air Force is Chief JoAnne S. Bass (/bæs/). On 14 August 2020, Chief Bass succeeded Chief Kaleth O. Wright, to become the 19th Chief Master Sergeant of the Air Force.

Although the Chief Master Sergeant of the Air Force is a non-commissioned officer, protocol states that the CMSAF has precedence over all lieutenant generals at joint events, and over all lieutenant generals except the Air Force Director of Staff at Air Force exclusive events.

Rank insignia and positional colors
On 1 November 2004, the CMSAF's rank insignia was updated to include the Great Seal of the United States of America and two stars in the upper field. This puts the insignia in line with those of the Army and Marine Corps which have similar insignia to denote their senior enlisted servicemen. The laurel wreath around the star in the lower field remained unchanged, to retain the legacy of the Chief Master Sergeants of the Air Force.

The CMSAF wears distinctive collar insignia.  Traditionally, enlisted airmen's collar insignia was silver-colored "U.S." within a ring. The CMSAF's collar brass replaced the standard ring with a silver laurel wreath. The CMSAF also wears a distinctive cap device. Enlisted airmen's cap device is the Coat of Arms of the United States, surrounded by a ring, all struck from silver-colored metal. Much as with the position's distinctive collar brass, the ring is replaced with a laurel wreath for the CMSAF.

The Sergeant Major of the Army, Chief Master Sergeant of the Air Force, Chief Master Sergeant of the Space Force, and the Senior Enlisted Advisor to the Chairman  are the only members of the United States armed forces below the rank of brigadier general/rear admiral (lower half) to be authorized a positional color (flag). The Chief Master Sergeant of the Air Force colors were authorized in January 2013.

The official term of address for the CMSAF is "Chief Master Sergeant of the Air Force" or "Chief."

Chief Master Sergeants of the Air Force

Timeline

See also
 Senior Enlisted Advisor to the Chairman of the Joint Chiefs of Staff
 Sergeant Major of the Army
 Sergeant Major of the Marine Corps
 Master Chief Petty Officer of the Navy
 Chief Master Sergeant of the Space Force
 Master Chief Petty Officer of the Coast Guard
 Senior Enlisted Advisor for the National Guard Bureau

References

External links

Senior Enlisted Advisor